Strange Highways is a collection of 12 short stories and two novels by  American suspense author Dean Koontz, released in May 1995.  Four of the stories are revised from their originals.  A British edition of the book (without the novella Chase) was previously issued by Headline in April 1995.

Cemetery Dance Publications printed a limited edition hardcover of the book.  It was slipcased and limited to 750 signed and numbered copies.

Content

"Strange Highways" (novel): a failed author returns to his hometown after many years to attend his father's funeral, only to find himself suddenly and inexplicably thrust back through time to relive a traumatic event from his past, and possibly to find redemption.   In the introduction, Koontz lists the Centralia, Pennsylvania, mine fire as an inspiration for this story.
"The Black Pumpkin": a twelve-year-old boy tries to stop his sadistic older brother from buying a monstrous-looking pumpkin from a creepy pumpkin carver, but to no avail. That night, the frightening truth about the pumpkin and its carver is revealed.
"Miss Attila the Hun": A bizarre alien lifeform tries to take over the planet, and the only thing in its way is a schoolteacher known as Miss Atilla the Hun.
"Down in the Darkness": after a couple buys a new house, the husband discovers a mysterious door that seems to appear and disappear at will. When he goes through it, he discovers a horrifying secret.
"Ollie's Hands": a young man with extraordinary psychic abilities and his tragic attempt to pursue a relationship with a woman whose life he saves. [Revised version]
"Snatcher": a loathsome purse snatcher steals a purse from a strange old woman, only to find out too late that there was far more to her (and her purse) than met the eye.
"Trapped": a woman and her son trying to fend off an attack by giant, mutated rats.
"Bruno": a private eye meets a "probability cop" from another dimension, and together they hunt down a dangerous alien. [Revised version]
"We Three": three siblings with special powers eliminate the rest of mankind, thinking that they're the "new race", but soon one of them is pregnant with a creature even more powerful who just might eliminate them. [Revised version]
"Hardshell": a wounded cop stalks a killer through an abandoned warehouse, but there's more to this seemingly stereotypical situation than meets the eye.
"Kittens": the first short story Koontz ever sold. An abused girl learns the horrible truth about God "taking her kittens to Heaven", and she devises an even more horrible revenge. [Revised version]
"The Night of the Storm": a group of intelligent robots go on a hunting trip in the woods, where they learn that the myth of "human beings" may not be a myth after all.
"Twilight of the Dawn": a devout atheist who finds his lack of faith challenged in the wake of his son's painful death from cancer.
"Chase" (novella): A Vietnam war hero goes on the hunt for a murderous criminal.

References
Link to limited version on Cemetery Dance Publication's webpage

1995 short story collections
Short story collections by Dean Koontz
Horror short story collections
Cemetery Dance Publications books